VonZipper is a subsidiary of the American surfing brand Boardriders, Inc., and specializes in eyewear for surfing, skateboarding, skiing, and snowboarding - sunglasses, goggles, and optics. It was founded in 2000 in San Clemente, California.

References

External links
 

Eyewear brands of Australia
Surfwear brands
Swimwear manufacturers
Skateboarding companies
Snowboarding companies
Sportswear brands
Retail companies of Australia
Clothing companies established in 1999
Retail companies established in 1999
Sporting goods manufacturers of Australia
Privately held companies of Australia
Clothing brands of Australia
Surfing in Australia
Eyewear companies of Australia
1999 establishments in California